Michał Rostkowski (born 10 August 2000) is a Polish professional footballer who plays as a midfielder for Górnik Zabrze.

References

External links
 
 

2000 births
Living people
Association football midfielders
Polish footballers
Ekstraklasa players
I liga players
II liga players
III liga players
Górnik Zabrze players
Resovia (football) players
Sportspeople from Ruda Śląska